Bosluiskloof Pass (English: Tick gap) is located in the Western Cape province of South Africa on the road between Laingsburg and the Gamkapoort Dam, not far from the town of Ladismith

Map of area

External links 
 Passes Index at Wild Dog Adventure Riding website

Mountain passes of the Western Cape